Angela Berry-White (born August 7, 1968) is a soccer coach and former player.

Playing career
Angela Berry White played soccer at George Mason University. While at George Mason in the 1980s, she was a three-time All-American soccer player. She was also a member of the USA national teams in 1988, 1992, and 1994. She played in the USWISL for Cincinnati and Columbus. She was inducted into the Indiana Soccer Hall of Fame in 2007.

Coaching career
Berry-White began her coaching career as an assistant women's soccer coach at Butler University and Indiana University.  She has been the girls' soccer head coach of Brebeuf Jesuit Preparatory School since 2014.

References

1968 births
Living people
American women's soccer players
George Mason Patriots women's soccer players
United States women's international soccer players
Women's association football defenders
Soccer players from Indianapolis